Joseph Peter Mascolo (March 13, 1929 – December 8, 2016) was an American musician and dramatic actor. During his long career, he acted in numerous motion pictures and television series. He played villain Stefano DiMera on NBC's soap opera Days of Our Lives from 1982 to 2016. He also starred as Massimo Marone on the CBS' soap opera The Bold and the Beautiful from 2001 to 2006.

Early life 
Mascolo was born on March 13, 1929, and raised in West Hartford, Connecticut. His parents, Anna Mascolo (née DeTuccio; 1910–2010) and Peter Mascolo (1901–2008), were immigrants from Naples, Italy, and had their 80th wedding anniversary shortly before his father died. Mascolo had one sister, Marie LaVoie. He attended the United States Military Academy after graduating high school. Mascolo attended the University of Miami. To support himself financially, he studied acting under famed acting coach Stella Adler in New York City. He originally was trained in classical music and opera.

Career

Theatre 
Mascolo was in the 1962 production of Night Life as Kazar and the understudy of Neville Brand. He was in the 1966 production of Dinner at Eight as Ricci. Mascolo was in the 1969 production of The Time of Your Life as Blick. His final theatrical appearance was in 1972's That Championship Season as Phil Romano.

Film 
Mascolo's first film appearance was in 1968's Hot Spur as Carlo. He was in 1972's neo-noir action crime–drama film Shaft's Big Score! as Gus Mascola. Mascolo was in 1973's The Spook Who Sat by the Door and 1978's Jaws 2 as Len Peterson. He was in 1981's Sharky's Machine as JoJo Tipps and 1982's Yes, Giorgio  Mascolo's last film appearance was in 1986's Heat as Baby.

Television 
Mascolo was best known in the recurring role of Stefano DiMera on Days of Our Lives from 1982 to 1985, returning briefly in 1988, again from 1993 to 2001, and making appearances again since 2007 until Stefano's death in 2016, making his final appearance on February 9, 2017, airing 2 months after his death, and won three Soap Opera Digest Awards.  He has also played a wide range of roles on many different series including (but not limited to) a Stefano-like villain named Nicholas Van Buren on General Hospital, and Carlos Alvarez on Santa Barbara. Before achieving his fame, he was seen in the earlier soap operas Where the Heart Is and From These Roots. He also made primetime television appearances on All in the Family, The Eddie Capra Mysteries, Lou Grant and The Rockford Files.

Mascolo portrayed Massimo Marone on CBS's The Bold and the Beautiful beginning August 2001.  He decided not to renew his contract with the show in July 2006, due to a lack of storyline and decided to return to Days of Our Lives, where his character Stefano DiMera was resurrected after six years.

Mascolo also appeared in The Incredible Hulk in October 1979, as Mr. Arnold in the episode "Brain Child". 10 years later, he would appear again in NBC's The Trial of the Incredible Hulk, as Albert G. Tendelli, a police confidant of Daredevil.
He also appeared in an episode of Hart to Hart on 1/3/84 as villan Mr. Rhodes.

Personal life and death 
Mascolo married Rose Maimone in 1953. Together they had a son named Peter. Maimone died in 1986. In 2005, he married his second wife, Patricia Schultz. In January 2016, Mascolo told Soap Opera Digest that he had suffered from a stroke in the spring of 2015. "During my rehab, I thought this would be a good time for Stefano to leave."

Mascolo died on December 8, 2016, in Santa Clarita, California at the age of 87 after years of battling Alzheimer's disease. Mascolo was interred at Forest Lawn Memorial Park (Hollywood Hills).

Theatre

Filmography

Film

Television

References

Sources

External links 
 
 
 
 

1929 births
2016 deaths
American male film actors
American male soap opera actors
American male television actors
American people of Italian descent
Burials at Forest Lawn Memorial Park (Hollywood Hills)
Male actors from Connecticut
People from West Hartford, Connecticut
University of Miami alumni
Military personnel from Connecticut
Deaths from Alzheimer's disease
Deaths from dementia in California